Ro-49 was an Imperial Japanese Navy Kaichū type submarine of the K6 sub-class. Completed and commissioned in May 1944, she served in World War II and patrolled off the Philippines and the Ryukyu Islands. She was lost during her third war patrol sometime in late March or April 1945.

Design and description
The submarines of the K6 sub-class were versions of the preceding K5 sub-class with greater range and diving depth. They displaced  surfaced and  submerged.

For surface running, the boats were powered by two  diesel engines, each driving one propeller shaft. When submerged each propeller was driven by a  electric motor. They could reach  on the surface and  underwater.

The boats were armed with four internal bow  torpedo tubes and carried a total of ten torpedoes. They were also armed with a single  L/40 anti-aircraft gun and two single  AA guns.

Construction and commissioning

Ro-49 was laid down on 16 November 1942 by Mitsui Zosensho at Tamano, Japan, as Submarine No. 390. She was named Ro-49 on 31 July 1943 and was attached provisionally to the Maizuru Naval District that day. Launched on 3 August 1943, she was completed and commissioned on 19 May 1944.

Service history
Upon commissioning, Ro-49 was attached formally to the Maizuru Naval District and assigned to Submarine Squadron 33 for workups. In mid-July 1944, she and the submarine  took part in tests of a submarine version of the Type 13 air-search radar. She was reassigned to Submarine Squadron 11 on 15 August 1944 and then to Submarine Division 34 in the 6th Fleet on 10 November 1944.

First war patrol

On 16 November 1944, Ro-49 departed Kure, Japan, to begin her first war patrol, assigned a patrol area in the Philippine Sea east of Luzon in the Philippine Islands. Her hydrophone suffered damage in rough seas, and on 28 November 1944 her commanding officer decided to return to Japan. She returned to Kure on 7 December 1944.

Second war patrol

Ro-49 set out from Kure on 1 January 1945 to begin her second war patrol, again in the Philippine Sea east of the Philippines. On 4 January 1945, she received new orders to patrol in the South China Sea west of Luzon. U.S. forces entered Lingayen Gulf and U.S. forces began their invasion of Luzon on 9 January 1945. She attacked and her commanding officer reported that she sank what he described as an "Idaho-class" battleship, but her claim of hitting a battleship was disproven after World War II. On 21 January 1945 he received an order to return to Kure, which she reached on 1 February 1945. She moved to Saeki on 16 March 1945.

Third war patrol

On 18 March 1945, Ro-49 got underway from Saeki for her third war patrol, assigned a patrol area southeast of the Ryukyu Islands. After she sent a routine situation report on 25 March 1945, the Japanese never heard from her again.

Loss

On 26 March 1945, a Japanese submarine attacked United States Navy Task Group 54.3 off the Ryukyus. At 09:32, the heavy cruiser  sighted a periscope to starboard, and she made an emergency turn to starboard to evade a torpedo. The light cruiser  also sighted torpedo wakes. The attacking submarine scored no hits but escaped without facing a counterattack by the cruisers′ escorts. The identity of the attacking submarine remains unknown, although historians have attributed the attack both to Ro-49 and to a Type C Kō-hyōteki-class midget submarine, in the latter case also claiming that the attack took place on 27 March 1945.

On 5 April 1945, the destroyer  was on radar picket duty off Kume Island near Okinawa when she received a signal from the support landing craft  reporting the sighting of a submarine. While the submarine was on the surface, Hudson detected it on radar at 0345. Hudson closed the range and fired a star shell to illuminate the area, and the submarine dived, causing it to disappear from Hudson′s radar.

The identity of the submarine Hudson sank remains unclear. It could have been Ro-49. Some Japanese sources claim that Ro-49 was already missing by 5 April 1945 and that Hudson sank the submarine , although I-56 might have been sunk on 18 April 1945 instead. Some accounts claim that the submarine  sank Ro-49 in the Bungo Strait on 24 February 1945, but Ro-49 was active for at least a month after that date.

On 15 April 1945, the Imperial Japanese Navy declared Ro-49 to be presumed lost southeast of Okinawa with all 79 men on board. She was stricken from the Navy list on 25 May 1945.

Notes

References
 

 

Ro-35-class submarines
Kaichū type submarines
Ships built by Mitsui Engineering and Shipbuilding
1943 ships
World War II submarines of Japan
Japanese submarines lost during World War II
Maritime incidents in April 1945
Missing submarines of World War II
Ships lost with all hands
World War II shipwrecks in the Pacific Ocean